Red Sucker Lake Water Aerodrome  is located adjacent to Red Sucker Lake, Manitoba, Canada.

See also
Red Sucker Lake Airport

References

Registered aerodromes in Manitoba
Seaplane bases in Manitoba

Island Lake Tribal Council
Transport in Northern Manitoba